Dolores Korman Sloviter (September 5, 1932 – October 12, 2022) was a United States circuit judge of the United States Court of Appeals for the Third Circuit. Beginning in April 2016, she stopped hearing cases or matters before the court.
Sloviter died on October 12, 2022, at the age of 90.

Education and career
Born to a Jewish-American family in 1932 in Philadelphia, Pennsylvania, Sloviter attended Philadelphia High School for Girls. She graduated from Temple University in 1953 with a bachelor's degree and received her Bachelor of Laws in 1956 from the University of Pennsylvania Law School, where she served as a Comments Editor of the University of Pennsylvania Law Review. She was a law clerk for the City of Philadelphia Law Department in 1955. Sloviter was in private law practice in Philadelphia until she became an Associate Professor of law at Temple University Beasley School of Law in 1972 and a Professor of Law at Temple in 1974, serving until 1979.

Federal judicial service
Sloviter was nominated by President Jimmy Carter on April 4, 1979, to the United States Court of Appeals for the Third Circuit, to a new seat created by 92 Stat. 1629. She was confirmed by the United States Senate on June 19, 1979, and received her commission on June 21, 1979, becoming the first woman to serve on the Third Circuit and the fourth woman to serve on a United States Court of Appeals. She served as Chief Judge from 1991 to 1998. Sloviter assumed senior status on June 21, 2013, the 34th anniversary of her appointment to the bench. Although Sloviter had been eligible to take senior status for some time, she long opted not to do so, preferring instead to remain an "active" judge, with a full caseload and full voting rights. On April 4, 2016, then-Chief Judge Theodore McKee announced that Judge Sloviter would assume "inactive status" and stop hearing cases due to a serious medical condition, but she would remain active within the court's committees. Sloviter died on October 12, 2022, at the age of 90.

Notable case
In 1996, Sloviter was a member of a three-judge panel of the Eastern District of Pennsylvania which heard a challenge to the Communications Decency Act, Title V of the Telecommunications Act of 1996, on grounds that it abridged the free speech provisions of the First Amendment. On June 12, 1996, their decision blocked enforcement of the act, ruling that it was unconstitutional, in addition to being unworkable and impractical from a technical standpoint. The "Findings of Fact" document — written for the case by Judges Sloviter, Ronald L. Buckwalter, and Stewart R. Dalzell — was posted on the Internet and cited as a lucid introduction to the Internet and related software. The U.S. Supreme Court upheld their ruling on June 18, 1997.

Book
In 2007, one of her former clerks, Saira Rao, published a book commonly assumed to be based on the author's experience working for Sloviter.

References

Sources 
 
 Lewis, Peter H. "Personal Computers: An Internet Primer by 3 Newbies". The New York Times. June 18, 1996. p. C11.

External links 

Transcript of Interview with Professor Judge Dolores Sloviter, Catharine Krieps, University of Pennsylvania Law School, April 2, 1999

1932 births
2022 deaths
20th-century American judges
20th-century American lawyers
20th-century American women judges
20th-century American women lawyers
21st-century American judges
21st-century American women judges
Judges of the United States Court of Appeals for the Third Circuit
Lawyers from Philadelphia
Philadelphia High School for Girls alumni
Temple University alumni
Temple University faculty
United States court of appeals judges appointed by Jimmy Carter
University of Pennsylvania Law School alumni